The Docks de France group is a former French distributor, bought in 1996 by Auchan.

History
 1904 : Toulouse and Picard creates the Central Docks Company in Tours, France
 1957 : Docks de France settles in the Paris region
 1963 : The first French hypermarket opens its doors
 1966 : Docks de France opens its first hypermarket under the brand SuperSuma
 1964 - 1993 Docks de France buys several regional companies
 1968 : Creation of the subsidiary Sabeco in Spain
 1969 : Creation of the Mammouth hypermarkets
 1978 : Creation of the Lil' Champ Food Stores in the SE United States
 1979 : Acquisition of the Picardy Beehive
 1982 : Creation of 'Atac
 1986 : Creation of the Super Pakbo warehouse stores
 1987 : Acquisition of Économats du Centre
 1991 : Shut down of Super Pakbo
 1993 : Acquisition of the Alsatian Supermarkets Company
 1995 : Equity in a distribution company in Poland
 1996 : Auchan Group takeover of Docks de France
 1997 : Lil' Champ Food Stores sold to The Pantry
 1998 : The Distribution companies: 'Société de Distribution de l'Ouest', 'Société de Distribution du Centre', 'Société de Distribution Alsacienne', 'Société Lyonnaise de Distribution' and 'Société de Distribution la Ruche Picarde' merged with the 'Société de Distribution Parisienne' under the name Atac.
 1999 : Reorganisation of the Auchan group
The hypermarkets Auchan and Mammouth amalgamate under the name of Auchan
 supermarkets and shops of Atac and Eco Service merge with the name of Atac
 2005 : Atac supermarkets rebrand as Simply Market

References

External links
 History of SUMA  
 History of Atac  
 History of Mammouth 

Supermarkets of France